Boronia thujona, commonly known as the bronzy boronia, is a plant in the citrus family Rutaceae and is endemic to near coastal areas of southern New South Wales. It is a shrub or small tree with aromatic, pinnate leaves and groups of between two and six bright pink flowers in the leaf axils.

Description
It has aromatic, pinnate leaves with between three and fifteen leaflets. The eight stamens have hairy filaments. The stigma is about the same width as the style.

Taxonomy and naming
Boronia thujona was first formally described in 1922 by Arthur de Ramon Penfold and Marcus Baldwin Welch and the description was published in Journal and proceedings of the Royal Society of New South Wales. The specific epithet (thujona) refers to the ketone, thujone that Penfold, a chemist, and Welch, an economic botanist, extracted from this plant.

The common name, bronzy boronia, was first used by Jean Galbraith in 1977 and refers to a bronze sheen, sometimes present on the leaves.

Distribution and habitat
The bronzy boronia grows in damp, shady forest in the Sydney region and south to the Budawang Range.

References 

thujona
Flora of New South Wales
Plants described in 1922